Jeeva is a 1995 Urdu Pakistani film directed by Syed Noor. The film introduced Babar Ali and Resham into Lollywood. Nadeem played the title role alongside Resham and Babar Ali. Playback singer Anwar Rafi is in this film. Folk singer Shaukat Ali sang a duet with  Noor Jehan. Jeeva was a Platinum Jubilee movie. The music was by M. Arshad.

Plot
Jeeva, A tribal Pathan leader attacks a rival pashtun clan harbouring a drug trafficker killing the drug lord and members of the pashtun clan. the two remaining sons of the clan pledge to take revenge for the killings.

Cast
Nadeem as Jeeva
Deeba as Deeba
Resham as Jeeva's daughter
Babar Ali

Songs
"Januun Suun Zara, Palkain Tau Uthha" sung by Anwar Rafi, song lyrics by Saeed Gillani, music by M. Arshad. Singer Anwar Rafi won the 'Best Male Singer' Nigar Award for this film in 1995.
"Chhu Lay Agar Tujhko Hawa, Tau Lagta Hai Yeh Mujhko Burra", sung by Anwar Rafi and Humaira Channa, song lyrics by Saeed Gillani and music by M. Arshad.

References

External links
Jeeva (1995 film) on IMDb website

1990s Urdu-language films
Urdu-language Pakistani films
1995 films
Pakistani action films
Films directed by Syed Noor
Films scored by M Ashraf
Nigar Award winners